Semitrivia is a genus of small sea snails, marine gastropod mollusks in the family Triviidae, the false cowries or trivias.

Species
Species within the genus Semitrivia include:
 Semitrivia calvitia Fehse, 2017
 † Semitrivia erugata (Tate, 1890) 
 Semitrivia hallucinata (Liltved, 1984)
Semitrivia tsuchidai Fehse, 2002
Synonym
 Semitrivia desirabilis (Iredale, 1912): synonym of Trivellona desirabilis (Iredale, 1912)

References

 Fehse D. (2002) Beiträge zur Kenntnis der Triviidae (Mollusca: Gastropoda) V. Kritische Beurteilung der Genera und Beschreibung einer neuen Art der Gattung Semitrivia Cossmann, 1903. Acta Conchyliorum 6: 3-48

External links
 Cossmann, M. (1903). Essais de paléoconchologie comparée. Cinquième livraison. Paris, The author and de Rudeval. 215 pp., 9 pls

Triviidae